Linda Perry (born April 15, 1965) is an American singer-songwriter, musician, and record producer. She was the lead singer and primary songwriter of 4 Non Blondes, and has since founded two record labels and composed and produced hit songs for several other artists.  They include: "Beautiful" by Christina Aguilera; "What You Waiting For?" by Gwen Stefani; and "Get the Party Started" by Pink. Perry has also contributed to albums by Adele, Alicia Keys, and Courtney Love, as well as signing and distributing James Blunt in the United States. Perry was inducted into the Songwriters Hall of Fame in 2015.

Early life
In 1965, Perry was born in Springfield, Massachusetts.  Growing up in an artistic and musical household, Perry displayed musical talent and interest from an early age. Despite struggling with kidney disease and then drug addiction, she still focused on music. Her mother is Brazilian (Marluce Martins Perry) and her father was Portuguese-American (Alfred Xavier Perry).

Career

1987–89: early career
In early 1986, at the age of 21, Perry moved to San Francisco. As a teenager in San Diego, she had pursued an interest in music, playing the guitar and auditioning for all-girl cover bands. Her arrival in San Francisco would mark the beginning of a career in music, though not before waiting tables, working coat-check, and working at a pizzeria.

In San Francisco, Perry lived in a small, windowless room, and would play her guitar and sing her own songs on city streets. Third Eye Blind frontman Stephan Jenkins, who at the time was also a struggling musician living in San Francisco, later recalled sitting in a room with Perry, who worked as a waitress down the street, performing their original compositions to one another. The two played each other early versions of "Semi-Charmed Life" and "What's Up?", both of which would become massive hits for their respective bands. It would be decades later that Jenkins realized the songs performed in that private session would sell a combined 17 million records.

1989–95: 4 Non Blondes
After some time spent performing solo at Bay Area clubs and coffeehouses, Perry composed her first professional song, called "Down On Your Face," and was recruited into the band 4 Non Blondes by its founder Christa Hillhouse in the middle of 1989. After several years of playing locally and negotiating with various record companies, the band finally signed with Interscope Records and released its debut album, Bigger, Better, Faster, More! on October 9, 1992. The album, featuring Perry as lead singer and dominated by her compositions, was an immediate success and spawned a hit single, the Perry-penned "What's Up?" (often erroneously called "What's Going On?" after its prominent chorus lyric).

In February 1994, Perry had a solo appearance in Roger Daltrey's production, album and video A Celebration: The Music of Pete Townshend and The Who. She shared the stage with the Juilliard Orchestra and members of The Who as she sang "Doctor Jimmy", "Acid Queen", "I'm Free" (in a duet with Roger Daltrey), and the encore for "Join Together" with original The Who members John Entwistle and Pete Townshend. In 1994, a CD and a VHS video of the shows were issued with the songs "Doctor Jimmy" and "I'm Free", while in 1998 a DVD was released with the song "I'm Free" only.

In 1994, Perry co-wrote with veteran singer/songwriter Janis Ian her song "Berlin", included on the 1995 album Revenge.

In June 1994, 4 Non Blondes guitarist Roger Rocha was replaced by Concrete Blonde member Jim Mankey, who had just played for Van Halen's cover "I'm the One" recorded as the theme from the movie Airheads. During sessions at Interscope studios in Los Angeles, the band struggled to come up with a followup to Bigger, and Perry left the band during the attempt to pursue a solo career. The band recorded one last video, for a cover of Led Zeppelin's "Misty Mountain Hop" with Dave Navarro on guitar.

In a 2011 Rolling Stone interview, while promoting her most recent band, Deep Dark Robot, Perry was quoted saying, "I wasn't really a big fan of my band" due to the "fluffy polished bullshit" sound of Bigger, Better, Faster, More!

1996–2010: solo career

With the band in disarray and the recording contract unfulfilled, Interscope reluctantly allowed Perry to make a solo CD, dropping the rest of the band. Interscope insisted on choosing the album's producer; the production team selected was Bill Bottrell and members of the Tuesday Night Music Club, who had recently produced Sheryl Crow's debut. Released in 1996, In Flight was moody, mellow and, at times, dark, far removed from the 4 Non Blondes sound. The release received positive notices, but was a poor seller. Perry joined Red Fish, Blue Fish for her world tour, supporting such acts as The Who. She promoted her CD with her own funds, including an appearance on The Howard Stern Show, during which she participated in "lesbian dial-a-date" and performed her former band's only hit single, "What's Up?" Perry also hosted the 1997 and 1998 Bammies (Bay Area Music Awards).

In 1997, Perry produced a film, Pink as the Day She Was Born, featuring cameos by Les Claypool of Primus and comedian Margaret Cho. She also launched her own record label, Rockstar Records, for the primary purpose of releasing a CD of band Stone Fox. In addition, she signed another local San Francisco band, 2 Lane Blacktop. The year 1998 saw Perry appearing and performing on CNN as part of a special on music and the Internet—how independent artists are cutting out the major labels. In 1999, she released her second solo album on Rockstar Records, After Hours. For the rest of 1999, she opened for Bryan Adams, reuniting with 4 Non Blondes' bassist Christa Hillhouse, then toured behind After Hours, with Hillhouse and San Francisco-based drummer Claudia Page.

In 2001, Perry again returned to music and touring. She wrote a handful of songs, two of which, "Beautiful" and "Cruz,"  appeared on Christina Aguilera's hit album Stripped. In 2001, she closed most of her shows with "Beautiful," a song she hoped would be her own comeback hit.

In 2002, Perry made a rare live performance at the Knitting Factory in Los Angeles, where she performed a set of original music and a set of Led Zeppelin covers. Also in 2002, she made an appearance on a solo record of Gordon Gano, Hitting the Ground, performing the song "So It Goes".

Perry made a live appearance at a DKNY benefit show in Los Angeles, where she joined Slash on stage for a version of Led Zeppelin's "Whole Lotta Love".

In 2005, Perry was a performer at ASCAP's showcase at the Sundance Film Festival. In August 2006, she played piano on Christina Aguilera's performance of "Hurt" at the MTV Video Music Awards.

Perry has signed with the independent label Kill Rock Stars Records, who re-released her solo album In Flight in October 2005. Featuring new artwork, the re-release includes original videos for "Fill Me Up" and "Freeway". In 2008, Perry played guitar in the video for Christina Aguilera's "Save Me from Myself". Perry made a live appearance at "Hope For Haiti Now" playing piano while Aguilera premiered a stripped-down version of their song "Lift Me Up". She also made guest appearances on Hole's "Nobody's Daughter" tour and on a concert of the Perry-signed band Little Fish in London. In May 2010, Perry again hosted the "Evening with Women" at L.A.'s Gay and Lesbian Centre, where she reunited with Pink for a live duet of Perry's song "What's Up?" Christina Aguilera invited Perry to her VH1 Storytellers concert in May 2010. Perry played piano to Aguilera's "Beautiful" and talked about the song.

On November 5, 2010, Perry appeared live in San Francisco with 4 Non Blondes guitar player Roger Rocha at TwentyFifty (formerly CELLSpace). The appearance celebrated the release of Rocha's album with his band The Golden Hearts. It was the first time in 20 years the two had appeared together live. Perry performed a solo set of cover tunes, including Radiohead's "Creep" and Soundgarden's "Black Hole Sun". Perry and Roger Rocha performed one song together, Led Zeppelin's "Since I've Been Loving You".

2001–2010: production and songwriting
In 2000, Perry was contacted by pop rock singer Pink, seeking production and songwriting assistance on her second album. Perry commented on the experience in an interview with HitQuarters: "She was this white girl singing R&B music, and it made absolutely no sense to me why she would call me. So when I got together with her my instinct said, 'Don't go and be an artist again, don't get another record deal, find out what you can do with her.' My manager freaked out when I called her and said, cancel all the showcases!" Perry co-wrote and produced much of Pink's successful album Missundaztood, which brought Perry back into the spotlight as a music producer. Perry took full writing credits for the songs "Get the Party Started" and "Lonely Girl". Perry next provided Christina Aguilera the hit "Beautiful".

Since then, she has gone on to work with many artists, including Jewel, Courtney Love, Gwen Stefani, Alicia Keys, Celine Dion, Blaque, Sugababes, Lillix, Robbie Williams, Melissa Etheridge, Sierra Swan, Solange Knowles, Gavin Rossdale, Juliette and the Licks, Lisa Marie Presley, Fischerspooner, Unwritten Law, L.P., Kelly Osbourne, James Blunt, Cheap Trick, Ben Jelen, Enrique Iglesias and Giusy Ferreri.

The 2002 Faith Hill album Cry has a song co-written by Perry and Alecia B. Moore (Pink).

In 2003, Perry won two American Society of Composers, Authors and Publishers awards for her songwriting, and a Grammy Awards nomination for her song "Beautiful" as a contender for "Song of the Year"; the song received the award for Best Female Pop Vocal Performance at the 46th Annual Grammy Awards.

With actress Gina Gershon, she wrote the song "StupidStar" for the movie Prey for Rock and Roll. With Brooklyn rocker L.P., she co-wrote "The Darkside" for Suburban Sprawl & Alcohol.

For most of 2004, Perry remained behind the scenes, making another appearance with Camp Freddy, this time at Los Angeles' Live 103's Birthday Concert. She joined Lisa Marie Presley on stage for songs they wrote together. The year 2004 also saw the release of Courtney Love's solo America's Sweetheart, to which Perry heavily contributed.

A song called "Girls & Boys", which was originally intended for Pink but later recorded by Britney Spears, was released as a bonus track on Spears' European DVD release. The track marked Perry's foray into more electroclash-inspired tunes.

She collaborated with art-dance duo Fischerspooner on a few songs for their upcoming release and ended the year with a few co-writing credits on Gwen Stefani's debut, Love. Angel. Music. Baby., including the album's first single, "What You Waiting For?" Additionally, her Atlantic-distributed label, Custard Records, was launched to promote two new acts, Sunshine and James Blunt. She produced and played guitar on the recording of Blunt's song "No Bravery". The year ended with Perry co-writing "Save Me" for the southern California punk rock band Unwritten Law.

Releases for 2005 included Kelly Osbourne's second album, which was written and produced by Perry. The lead track from Osbourne's second album, "One Word", reached the top of the UK and US dance charts.

Perry contributed to Christina Aguilera's third studio album, Back to Basics (2006). Perry and Aguilera co-wrote every song on the album's second disc.

2007 saw Perry working with Vanessa Carlton on her third studio album, Heroes and Thieves. She also co-wrote and did session work on many of the songs on Sierra Swan's solo album, Ladyland. She continued work with Courtney Love, Kelis, Cheap Trick, Ziggy Marley, Ben Jelen, Skin, Enrique Iglesias, The Format on the song "Dead End," and "Darker Side of The Moon" on Bay Area artist Goapele's Change It All album.

Perry won an award from the San Francisco chapter of the Recording Academy for her contribution to the world of music. The years 2007 and 2008 saw more tunes written or produced by Linda Perry: The Section Quartet, Alicia Keys, Vanessa Carlton, and Gina Gershon.

Perry signed the group Little Fish to her label in 2008 and began producing its album, titled Baffled and Beat, which was released in August 2010. Also in that same year, she collaborated with Daniel Powter to produce his third studio album Under the Radar.

She wrote and produced "A Loaded Smile" for the 2009 debut album For Your Entertainment by Adam Lambert. Aguilera's sixth studio album, Bionic, released in 2010, included another track, written and produced solely by Perry, "Lift Me Up".

2010–2020: recent career
In 2010, Perry worked with KT Tunstall and wrote a few songs with her, some of which would later be featured on Tunstall's third studio album Tiger Suit, released in September of that year.

Perry announced on her Facebook and Twitter profiles in June that she was "going to make an album" with her new band Deep Dark Robot, which she founded with Tony Tornay. The album, 8 Songs About a Girl, was promoted with the single "Won't You Be My Girl?" Perry imagined the name Deep Dark Robot as part of an ad-libbed song lyric—"deep dark robot falling in love"—and decided to hang onto the name for her next musical project. The band released the album in March 2011 and began touring.

Perry also worked with Rivers Cuomo and Weezer on their song "Brave New World".

In 2010 and 2011, Perry, along with Fox Entertainment Group, was the Presenting Sponsor of the Los Angeles talent show STARFEST, benefiting the L.A.C.E.R. Afterschool Programs.

In 2014, Perry appeared in the VH1 reality television show Make or Break: The Linda Perry Project, in which she worked with up-and-coming musicians, like VanJess and winner Hemming.

Perry was scheduled to appear as the house band in a special series of late night editions of The Talk airing the week of January 12, 2015 in the 12:34 am time slot of The Late Late Show.

In June 2015, Perry was inducted into the Songwriters Hall of Fame at a ceremony in New York.

In 2015, Perry wrote the theme song for the film Freeheld titled "Hands of Love," performed by Miley Cyrus.

Perry co-wrote a song with Adele for her 2015 album 25 titled "Can't Let Go" which was included as a bonus track on the Target and Japanese editions. Perry played piano, produced and engineered the track.

In 2017 she co-wrote and produced the song "Shine", which was sung and co-written by Pat Benatar. It was written for the Women's March on Washington. Later that year she teamed again with Benatar for the song "Dancing Through the Wreckage" which was featured as the lead single from the documentary "Serve Like a Girl".

In 2018 Perry collaborated with Dolly Parton, writing the Golden Globe-nominated "Girl In The Movies" for the Netflix film Dumplin'. Parton, speaking about working with Perry, said "They said 'Would you be willing to write it with Linda Perry?' She's from I guess a group called 4 Non Blondes years ago; I wasn't that familiar, I didn't know her, I never met her. and if she could produce it, and I said well, sure, I would be a team player. So I met her and we just hit it off and we started writing all these other songs for the movie, and then... we just made a whole little album."

In 2020, Linda co-wrote "A Beautiful Noise" with seven other female writers - Alicia Keys, Brandi Carlile, Brandy Clark, Hillary Lindsey, Lori McKenna, Hailey Whitters and Ruby Amanfu - and the song was performed by Alicia Keys and Brandi Carlile with the purpose of inspiring American voters to vote in the 2020 Presidential Election.

iPhone sessions
In July 2011, Perry started to publish a set of acoustic cover songs that she recorded with her iPhone, including "Mad World" by Tears for Fears, "Just What I Needed" by the Cars, and "Creep" by Radiohead, among many others. On her Facebook account, she wrote: "iPhone sessions are me sitting at my piano an recording song into iPhone voice memo. Then I post it. Very simple enjoy :)"

We Are Hear
In 2017, Perry partnered with Kerry Brown to launch We Are Hear, a record label, music publisher, and artist management company based in Los Angeles. Under their leadership, the company has signed recording artists Natasha Bedingfield, Imogen Heap, Dorothy, and Willa Amai among others, and collaborated with artist Kii Arens. Perry has also co-curated events with We Are Hear such as One Love Malibu festival in 2018, which raised $1 million in relief funds for damage caused by the Woolsey Fire, and The Art of Elysium fundraiser Heaven Is Rock & Roll in 2020, featuring the surviving members of Nirvana (Dave Grohl, Pat Smear, and Krist Novoselic) performing alongside Beck and St. Vincent, in addition to performances from Cheap Trick, L7, and Marilyn Manson.

Personal life

Perry is a lesbian. In 1995, she told a journalist from The Advocate, "All my life I've loved women, and that's it. I've never been any other way." Earlier at the 1994 Billboard Music Awards she displayed the slang word "dyke" on her guitar for a performance with 4 Non Blondes.

Perry was in a relationship with actress Clementine Ford from 2009 to 2010.

Perry began a relationship with actress Sara Gilbert in 2011. They announced their engagement in April 2013 and married on March 30, 2014.  Gilbert gave birth to their son Rhodes Emilio Gilbert Perry, on February 28, 2015. Perry was stepmother to Gilbert's son and daughter from a previous relationship. In December 2019, Gilbert filed for legal separation from Perry.

Discography

Solo works

Albums

Singles

Production and songwriting

Singles produced or written by Linda Perry

Other appearances
 Susanna Hoffs by Susanna Hoffs (1996): "Weak With Love", guitar and backing vocals by Linda Perry
 Missundaztood by Pink (2001): "Lonely Girl" featuring Linda Perry
 Hitting the Ground by Gordon Gano (2002), Instinct Records (August 19, 2002): "So It Goes", music and lyrics by Gordon Gano, vocals by Linda Perry also featuring Frank Ferrer
 Prey for Rock & Roll by Various Artists (2003): "Stupid Star", performed by Gina Gershon, Linda Perry and Patty Schemel
 Odyssey by Fischerspooner (2005): "Happy", additional vocals by Linda Perry
 Back to Basics by Christina Aguilera (2006): "Enter the Circus", performed by Linda Perry (uncredited)
 Plain Girl, Wild Love by Planet Swan (2007): "Chompin' on a Bit", performed by Planet Swan featuring Linda Perry and Sierra Swan
 Fuzzbox by The Section Quartet (2007): "Paranoid Android", operatic vocals by Linda Perry
 Cheat the Gallows by Bigelf (2008): "Superstar" and "Race With Time", backing vocals by Linda Perry
 Under the Radar by Daniel Powter (2008): "Am I Still the One?", performed with Daniel Powter, "My So Called Life", performed with Daniel Powter

Awards and nominations

Critics' Choice Movie Awards

Georgia Film Critics Association

Golden Globe Awards

Grammy Awards

Guild of Music Supervisors Awards

Hollywood Music in Media Awards

Songwriters Hall of Fame

Žebřík Music Awards

Notes

References

External links

 

1965 births
Living people
American people of Brazilian descent
American musicians of Portuguese descent
American rock singers
American contraltos
Guitarists from Massachusetts
Record producers from Massachusetts
Singers from Massachusetts
Songwriters from Massachusetts
Custard Records artists
American women rock singers
American lesbian musicians
Lesbian singers
Lesbian songwriters
LGBT record producers
LGBT people from Massachusetts
American LGBT singers
American LGBT songwriters
Businesspeople from Springfield, Massachusetts
Musicians from Springfield, Massachusetts
A&R people
American people of Portuguese descent
20th-century American women guitarists
21st-century American women guitarists
4 Non Blondes members
American women record producers
20th-century American women singers
21st-century American women singers
Brazilian American